Mauricio Pineda (born October 17, 1997) is an American professional soccer player who plays as a defensive midfielder for Major League Soccer club Chicago Fire.

Club career

College and youth
Pineda was part of the Chicago Fire academy, before attending the University of North Carolina at Chapel Hill, where he played college soccer from 2016 to 2019, making 79 appearances, scoring 17 goals and tallying 8 assists.

While at college, Pineda also appeared for USL League Two sides Tobacco Road FC and North Carolina FC U23.

Chicago Fire
On January 17, 2020, Pineda signed a one-year contract with Chicago Fire as a Homegrown Player, with options for a further three seasons. Pineda made his professional debut on March 1, 2020, starting in a 2–1 loss to Seattle Sounders at CenturyLink Field.

On July 14, 2020 Pineda earned his first assist and scored his first professional goal for the Fire, also against Seattle in the MLS is Back Tournament. The Fire won 2–1 with Pineda's goal the game-winner. The following day he signed a contract for the club until 2021.

International career
In December 2020 after his first professional season in MLS, Pineda was called up to the United States national team, the first call up he'd received at any age level. Pineda was named to the final 20-player United States under-23 roster for the 2020 CONCACAF Men's Olympic Qualifying Championship in March 2021.

Career statistics

Club

Personal
Born in the United States, Pineda is of Mexican descent. He is the younger brother of former soccer player Victor Pineda, who also played for Chicago Fire.

References

External links 
 
 

1997 births
Living people
American soccer players
American sportspeople of Mexican descent
Association football midfielders
North Carolina Tar Heels men's soccer players
Tobacco Road FC players
North Carolina FC U23 players
Chicago Fire FC players
Major League Soccer players
Soccer players from Illinois
People from Bolingbrook, Illinois
Sportspeople from DuPage County, Illinois
USL League Two players
Homegrown Players (MLS)
United States men's under-23 international soccer players
Association football defenders